IGN Convention (IGN Con) is a video games, movies, comics and pop culture convention held in various cities in the Middle East. The event generally includes celebrities, video game tournaments, table top games, card games, movie previews, comic book stalls and a cosplay competition. A number of Middle Eastern artists and game developers also showcase their work at IGN Convention. This convention is owned and operated by IGN Middle East, the Middle Eastern edition of popular video games website IGN.

IGN Convention is the spiritual successor to GameFest, a biannual, smaller scale gaming gallery which was originally hosted by IGN Middle East's parent company T-break Media between 2010 and 2012, before the hosting duties were subsequently taken over by AMD EMEA. The IGN Convention logo was designed by prominent Gulf based artist Ashraf Ghori.

History

2013

IGN Convention Dubai 2013 

Held on 5–6 July 2013 at Meydan IMAX, Dubai, United Arab Emirates

Special Guests: Kevin Nash, Naomi Kyle, Ashraf Ghori, Royce Gracie

Key Attractions: Cosplay Competition, Last of Us on IMAX screen

IGN Convention Bahrain 2013 

Held on 18–19 October 2013 at Bahrain Exhibition Center, Manama, Bahrain

Special Guests: Troy Baker, Keiji Inafune, Ryan Hart

Key Attractions: PlayStation 4 Preview, Oculus Rift, Cosplay Competition, Bahrain Game Developers

2014

IGN Convention Bahrain 2014 

Held on 24–25 October at Bahrain International Circuit, Sakhir, Bahrain

Special Guests: Troy Baker, Naomi Kyle, Hafþór Júlíus Björnsson, Julia Voth, The Experiment, Mohammad Fikree, Hamad Qalam

Key Attractions: Cosplay Competition, Troy Baker Concert, Celebrity Q&A, Workshops in Film and Gaming Topics, DJ Session, Sumo Tournament, Freestyle Performance

IGN Convention Dubai 2014 

Held on 21–22 November 2014 at Dubai International Marine Club, Dubai, United Arab Emirates

Special Guests: Troy Baker, Hafþór Júlíus Björnsson, Ryan Hart, Riddle, Falah Hashim, Amal Hawijeh, S.A Zaidi and Ghanem Ghubash, Mohammad Fikree, Haidar Mohammed, Ashraf Ghori, Faisal Hashmi

Key Attractions: Cosplay Contest, Troy Baker Concert, Celebrity Q&A, Panels and Workshops

2015

IGN Convention Qatar 2015 

Held on 26–27 February 2015 at Qatar National Convention Center, Doha, Qatar

Special Guests: Hafthór Júlíus Björnsson, Adam Harrington, Dave Fennoy, NadiaSK

Key Attractions: Celeb guests, video Games showcase, retro gaming museum

IGN Convention Bahrain 2015 

Held on 2–3 October 2015 at Bahrain International Circuit, Sakhir, Bahrain

Special Guests: Booker T, Dave Fennoy, Adam Harrington, Julia Voth, Riddle

Key Attractions: Cosplay Competition, Celebrity Q&A, Workshops in Film and Gaming Topics, DJ Session, Sumo Tournament, Freestyle Performance

IGN Convention Abu Dhabi 2015 

Held on 16–17 October 2015 at du Forum, Abu Dhabi, United Arab Emirates

Special Guests: Jack Gleeson, Naomi Kyle, Dave Fennoy, Adam Harrington, NadiaSK

Key Attractions: Cosplay Competition with $10,000 Prize Money, PlayStation VR showcase, HTC Vive showcase, Celebrity Q&A, Workshops in Film and Gaming Topics

2016

IGN Convention Bahrain 2016 

Held on 22-23 October 2016 at Bahrain International Circuit, Sakhir, Bahrain

Special Guests: Kurt Angle, Giancarlo Esposito, Alodia Gosiengfiao

Key Attractions: Cosplay Competition, Celebrity Q&A, Workshops in Film and Gaming Topics, DJ Session, Sumo Tournament, Freestyle Performance

IGN Convention Oman 2016 

Held on 9-10 December 2016 at Oman Convention & Exhibition Centre, Oman

Special Guests: Kristian Nairn, Dave Fennoy, Adam Harrington,

Key Attractions: Cosplay Competition, Celebrity Q&A, Video Games Zone, Table Top Games

References 

 IGN Convention Dubai in Pictures
 Hardcore Gaming 101 Blog: IGN Convention in Bahrain
 Superheroes and Celebs at IGN Convention at Meydan IMAX
 Get your game on at IGN Convention
 IGN Convention Comes to Doha
 Troy Baker's Concert in Bahrain
 Sky News Cosplay Report
 Celebrity Ask Me Anything in Dubai 2014
 Bleeding Cool Blog: IGN Convention in Dubai

External links 

 

IGN
Video game trade shows